The 2018–19 season was Bolton Wanderers's second season back in the second tier of English football following their immediate return from EFL League One. The season covered the period from 1 July 2018 to 30 June 2019.

Pre-season
Friendlies against St Mirren, Atherton Collieries, FC Halifax Town, Morecambe, Girona, Guiseley and Peterborough United were confirmed. The game against St Mirren was cancelled a day before when the players went on strike due to unpaid wages. Bolton's game against Morecambe was changed from an away game to a behind closed doors match at Bolton's Lostock training ground due to Globe Arena not yet being ready to host football matches.

Competitions

EFL Championship

League table

Results summary

Results by matchday

Matches
On 21 June 2018, the Championship fixtures for the forthcoming season were announced. Bolton began their league campaign at newly relegated West Bromwich Albion on August 4 and finished it away at Nottingham Forest on May 5.

FA Cup

The third round draw was made live on BBC by Ruud Gullit and Paul Ince from Stamford Bridge on 3 December 2018. The fourth round draw was made live on BBC by Robbie Keane and Carl Ikeme from Wolverhampton on 7 January 2019.

EFL Cup

On 15 June 2018, the draw for the first round was made in Vietnam.

Squad

Statistics

|-
|colspan=14|Player(s) who left the club:

|}

Goals record

Disciplinary record

Transfers

Transfers in

Transfers out

Loans in

Loans out

References

Bolton Wanderers F.C. seasons
Bolton Wanderers